Gingee is a panchayat town in Viluppuram district in the Indian state of Tamil Nadu.

Gingee may also refer to:

 Gingee (State Assembly Constituency), a state assembly constituency in Tamil Nadu
 Gingee Fort, one of the few surviving forts in Tamil Nadu
 Gingee N. Ramachandran (born 1944), Indian politician
 Gingee taluk, a taluk in Tamil Nadu

See also

 Ginge (disambiguation)
 Gingy